The Old House is a Hristic family house in Tijabara, Pirot. Built in 1848, it was placed under protection of the Serbian state in 1953, and in 1979 it became a Monument of Culture of Exceptional Importance for Serbia. After that, the Old House became a museum. It is Pirot's best preserved example of traditional architecture from the mid-19th century. It belonged to respectable trader Hrista Jovanović.

History 

The house took two years to construct and was completed on April 5 1848, as confirmed in an engraving on the building's floor. Hrista Jovanović needed permission from the Turkish authorities to build it, as he intended for it to be significant, with two floors. Thus, he built one of Pirot's most luxurious Christian houses in the mid-nineteenth century on the outskirts of the town.

Unfortunately, no information currently exists about the craftsmen who built it. To this day, it is still unclear who designed it – whether it was "Little Rista" who dreamed it up while travelling through the Ottoman Empire for trade purposes, or skilled builders.

Hrista Jovanović lived in this house with his family before it was passed down to his descendants, whose surname changed from Jovanović to Hristić. After World War II, the building was turned into a museum by the municipality of Pirot.

Construction and layout 

The building is crowned by a unique, gazebo-style roof, while wooden window frames and decorated lathes on the building's corners add features to its bright white facade. Through the porch is the hall, which features a fireplace and storage for flour and wood. This room is flanked by two bedrooms. A wooden staircase leads to the spacious upstairs living room, which is divided into:
 A central section with shelves and a fireplace
 The "divanhana" (men's room)
 The women's room

Various uniquely-named rooms lead off the hall: the bedroom, the Kandil (Thurible) Room, the Great Room, the Treasury, and the Sar'k Room. 

While the ground floor was used day-to-day by the house's residents, the upstairs were reserved for prominent guests. A staircase leads up from the second floor to a viewing platform on the roof. The roof has wide eaves that are lined with shingle and form a wreath of archivolts over the windows at the front and sides of the house. This unique roof design is unusual even in the Balkans. 

There are several engraved cabinets in the house. The best work is on the ground floor and is attributed to a craftsman of the famous Debar school. The ceiling of the divanhana is also engraved, while the Great Room features a plaster stucco ceiling. Typical of Serbian architecture of this period, the house also has a secret passage and a unique "Kandil" (thurible) Room. The secret passage was accessed from behind the downstairs cabinet and led to the house's rear entrance under the staircase. In the Kandil room, an iconostasis adorned the eastern wall, and a thurible would be burnt during religious holidays.

Trivia

Movies 
A large part of "Zona Zamfirova" was filmed in the Old House, which was the setting for Hadzi Zamfir's residence. "Ivkova slava," another cult Serbian movie, was also filmed almost entirely in the house's grounds and interior.

Hrista Jovanović - Little Rista 
Hrista Jovanović, better known as Čučuk Rista or Mali Rasta (Little Rista), was a prominent merchant in Pirot and the Ottoman Empire. He was originally settled in the Zavoj village, which had been submerged under lake in the second half of the 19th century. He later settled near Pirot in 1830. Rista was not originally a merchant, instead choosing his calling when settling near Pirot. His progress and success in that was very fast, and after the suggestions of Çorbacı and Turkish authorities from Pirot in 1840, he became a Kalauz (cow and butter tax collector) for Vidin pasha. He briefly worked for Usein pasha in the Pirot district, and became independent not long after. At that time, he gained an great wealth from commerce via Ottoman Empire. He traveled to Niš, Leskovac, Vidin, Sofia, Carigrad with purpose of selling his goods. In 1845, he received permission to build a house, and construction works were finished after 3 years in 1848. After that, the house was known as a quarter of Little Rista, later known as Old House. However, he was known to be greedy, and he repeatedly sold the same goods to the Turkish army, for which he was expelled from Pirot by Sadrezam pasha.

Little Rista's room 
In Pirot, Serbs were forced to obey to the Turkish authorities. Discontent, Little Rista decided to force Turkish authorities to bow to him. As he was "almost like a dwarf, Little Rista purposefully built a room with a very low ceiling. The Turkish authorities like pashas, who were very tall, were forced to bend down if they want to enter the room. When the authorities questioned him, Little Rista simply stated: "I am a short man, so my room is smaller, it was made for me only", avoiding arrest for disrespect. In that way, he made the Turkish authorities bow to him, which was unthinkable at the time.

See also
Monument of Culture of Exceptional Importance
Tourism in Serbia

References

External links

Old house like tourist destination
Museum Old house in Pirot
Museum Old house official Facebook site

Cultural Monuments of Exceptional Importance (Serbia)
Architecture in Serbia
Buildings and structures in Pirot
Houses completed in 1848
Museums in Serbia